NA-75 Gujranwala-II is a constituency for the National Assembly of Pakistan.

Members of Parliament

2018-2022: NA-84 Gujranwala-VI

Election 2002 

General elections were held on 10 Oct 2002. Chaudhry Bilal Ijaz of PML-Q won by 73,107 votes.

Election 2008 

General elections were held on 18 Feb 2008. Mudassar Qayyum Nahra an Independent candidate won by 57,320 votes.

Election 2013 

General elections were held on 11 May 2013. Azhar Qayyum Nahra of PML-N won by 89,826 votes and became the  member of National Assembly.

Election 2018 
General elections were held on 25 July 2018.

See also
NA-74 Gujranwala-I
NA-76 Gujranwala-III

References

External links
 Election result's official website

NA-100